Heteronym may refer to:
 Heteronym (linguistics), one of a group of words with identical spellings but different meanings and pronunciations
 Heteronym (literature), imaginary characters created by a poet

See also
 -onym
 Homonym
 Capitonym
 Homograph
 Polysemy
 Mondegreen